Igor Cherdakov (born 3 October 1955) is a Russian former swimmer. He competed in the men's 200 metre breaststroke at the 1972 Summer Olympics for the Soviet Union.

References

External links
 

1955 births
Living people
Russian male breaststroke swimmers
Olympic swimmers of the Soviet Union
Swimmers at the 1972 Summer Olympics
Place of birth missing (living people)
Soviet male breaststroke swimmers
Universiade silver medalists for the Soviet Union
Medalists at the 1973 Summer Universiade
Universiade medalists in swimming